Bradley Creek is a  long 3rd order tributary to the Banister River in Halifax County, Virginia.

Variant names
According to the Geographic Names Information System, it has also been known historically as:
 Bradleys Creek

Course 
Bradley Creek rises at Volens, Virginia in Halifax County and then flows south-southwest to join the Banister River about 2.5 miles west-southwest of Millstone.

Watershed 
Bradley Creek drains  of area, receives about 45.4 in/year of precipitation, has a wetness index of 359.85, and is about 63% forested.

See also 
 List of Virginia Rivers

References 

Rivers of Virginia
Rivers of Halifax County, Virginia]
Tributaries of the Roanoke River